Ich (German for "I" or "Me") is the second studio album by German rapper Sido. After two weeks of release (on 4 December 2006), it reached gold status. The album climbed to number 4 in the albums chart.

Track listing 

 Uncredited samples
"Goldjunge" contains a sample of "Tightrope" by Electric Light Orchestra
"Schlechtes Vorbild" contains a sample of "Hold the Line" by Toto
"1000 Fragen" contains a sample of "Warum?" by Tic Tac Toe
"Ficken" contains a sample of "GoldenEye" by Tina Turner
"Wir haben noch Zeit" contains a sample of "Crazy Train" by Ozzy Osbourne and "Hip-Hop" by Dead Prez

Year-end charts

References 

2006 albums
Sido (rapper) albums
German-language albums